Basket Astarac Mirande was a French women's basketball club from Mirande. Founded in 1975, it won three national championships between 1988 and 1990, appearing in the European Cup. It was disestablished in 1997.

Titles
 Nationale Féminine 1A
 1988, 1989, 1990

References

Women's basketball teams in France
Basketball teams established in 1975
EuroLeague Women clubs